Elizabeth Anne Lomax (22 February 1810 – 16 March 1895) was a British botanist whose herbarium is kept in Manchester.

References 

Women botanists
1810 births
1895 deaths
19th-century British botanists
19th-century British women scientists